= Childhood Sexual Experiences =

2009 nonfiction book by Sally V. Hunter

- Author: Sally V. Hunter
- Language: English
- Publisher: CRC Press
- Publication date: 2009
- Publication place: United Kingdom
- Pages: 212
- ISBN: 978-1846193378

Childhood Sexual Experiences: Narratives of Resilience is a 2009 non-fiction book written by University of New England lecturer Sally V. Hunter, published by CRC Press.

The book examines accounts from a sample of people who have had sexual experiences with an adult when they were younger than 16. The book was titled "childhood sexual experiences" because not all participants had characterized their experience as sexual abuse.
